Vincent Council (born October 15, 1990) is an American professional basketball player who last played for Levickí Patrioti. He is a 1.88 m (6 ft 2 in) tall Point guard.

High school career
Council played high school basketball at The Patterson School, in Lenoir, North Carolina.

College career
Council played college basketball with the Providence Friars, from 2009 to 2013.

Professional career
Council began his pro career in with  Hapoel Tel Aviv in 2013. In June 2014, he signed with Rethymno of the Greek Basket League. On September 22, 2015, Council joined Koroivos Amaliadas.

On June 9, 2017, Council joined BC Nokia of the Korisliiga.

References

External links
RealGM.com Profile
Twitter Profile
Eurobasket.com Profile
Draftexpress.com Profile
Greek Basket League Profile 
ESPN.com Profile 
Providence College Friars Profile

1990 births
Living people
American expatriate basketball people in Finland
American expatriate basketball people in Greece
American expatriate basketball people in Israel
Basketball players from New York City
BC Nokia players
Hapoel Tel Aviv B.C. players
Koroivos B.C. players
Providence Friars men's basketball players
Point guards
Rethymno B.C. players
Sportspeople from Brooklyn
American men's basketball players